The George Deffenbaugh Mound is a Native American mound in the southeastern part of the U.S. state of Ohio. It was first excavated at an unknown date prior to 1941; at this time, a hole was sunk from the mound's crest to its base, and a smaller hole was dug into its edge.

The mound's location and conical shape indicates that it is a work of the Adena culture, which was active between 1000 BC and AD 400.

In 1974, the Deffenbaugh Mound was listed on the National Register of Historic Places because of its potential to be a valuable archaeological site.

References

Adena culture
Archaeological sites in Ohio
National Register of Historic Places in Hocking County, Ohio
Archaeological sites on the National Register of Historic Places in Ohio
Mounds in Ohio
20th-century archaeological discoveries